Gordon Ralph Maltzberger (September 4, 1912 – December 11, 1974) was an American professional baseball player. The native of Utopia, Texas, was a right-handed relief pitcher over parts of four seasons (1943–1944 and 1946–47) with the Chicago White Sox of Major League Baseball, and led the American League in saves (14) and (12) over his first two MLB seasons.

He spent much of his minor-league pitching career in the top-level Pacific Coast League. After brief stints with the 1932 Los Angeles Angels and 1934 Hollywood Stars, he put in seven full seasons from 1936–1942 in other, lower-classification leagues before making the White Sox in  during the midst of the World War II manpower shortage. At the time, Maltzberger was one of the few baseball players who wore glasses and may not have had a big-league trial if it were not for the fact many players had joined the military in support of the war. He would also serve in the United States Army in 1945, missing that season.

For his MLB career, he compiled a 20–13 record in 135 appearances, all in relief, with 33 career saves (not yet an official statistic) and a 2.70 earned run average. In 293 innings pitched, he allowed  258 hits and 74 bases on balls, with 136 strikeouts. 

Maltzberger returned to the minors in 1948 and enjoyed six successful seasons with the Hollywood Stars. He then managed in the Pittsburgh Pirates, Milwaukee Braves and White Sox farm systems and served as the pitching coach of the Minnesota Twins for three seasons.

He died in Rialto, California, at the age of 62. He was buried at the Hermosa Memorial Cemetery in Colton, California.

See also
 List of Major League Baseball annual saves leaders

References

External links

1912 births
1974 deaths
Atlanta Crackers players
Baseball players from Texas
Chicago White Sox players
Chicago White Sox scouts
Dallas Rebels players
Hollywood Stars players
Jackson Senators players
Knoxville Smokies players
Los Angeles Angels (minor league) players
Macon Peaches players
Major League Baseball pitchers
Major League Baseball pitching coaches
Milwaukee Braves scouts
Minnesota Twins coaches
Minor league baseball managers
New Orleans Pelicans (baseball) players
People from Uvalde County, Texas
St. Jean Canadians players
Shreveport Sports players
Sportspeople from Rialto, California
United States Army personnel of World War II